The 2015 Gardner–Webb Runnin' Bulldogs football team represented Gardner–Webb University in the 2015 NCAA Division I FCS football season. They were led by third-year head coach Carroll McCray and played their home games at Ernest W. Spangler Stadium. They were a member of the Big South Conference. They finished the season 4–7, 2–4 in Big South play to finish in a tie for fifth place.

Schedule

Source: Schedule

Game summaries

at South Alabama

Elon

Virginia Union

at Wofford

Liberty

at Kennesaw State

Charleston Southern

at Presbyterian

at Coastal Carolina

East Tennessee State

Monmouth

References

Gardner-Webb
Gardner–Webb Runnin' Bulldogs football seasons
Gardner-Webb Runnin' Bulldogs f